= HIV/AIDS in Sudan =

Sudan is bordered by seven countries in which HIV/AIDS is highly prevalent, therefore Sudan is susceptible to an increase in HIV/AIDS prevalence. In 1986, the first case of HIV and AIDS in Sudan was reported. Sudan's HIV epidemiological situation is currently classified as a low epidemic, as of July 2011.

== Transmission ==
The main mode of transmission worldwide is through heterosexual contact, which is no different in Sudan. In Sudan, heterosexual transmission accounted for 97% of HIV positive cases.

== Prevalence ==
As of January 5, 2011, the adult (15–49) prevalence in Sudan was found to be 0.4%, an estimated 260,000 were living with HIV and there were 12,000 HIV related annual deaths. A population based study was conducted in 2002 which estimated the sero-prevalence to be 1.6%. According to recent studies, the HIV and AIDS prevalence in Sudan among blood donors has increased from 0.15% in 1993 to 1.4% in 2000. Sudan is considered to be a country with an intermediate HIV and AIDS prevalence by the World Health Organization (WHO).

HIV/AIDS estimates as of 2014:

HIV prevalence	53,000 [41,000–69,000]
Ages 15–49 prevalence rates	0.2% [0.2–0.3%]
Ages 15 and above living with HIV	49,000 [38,000–63,000]
Women aged 15 and above living with HIV	23,000 [18,000–29,000]
Ages 0–14 living with HIV	4,300 [3,600–5,200]
AIDS related deaths	2,900 [2,200–4,200]

== Treatment, care and support ==
HIV/AIDS related-services have been introduced in all the states of Sudan. Free services have been provided across the country, which have significantly improved the life of people living with HIV.

== Government policy ==
As recently as 1998, the Sudanese government denied that HIV/AIDS posed any significant health threat to its citizenry. Only in 2004 did the government reverse its policy and officially begin planning to address the problem. As of 2007, both Northern and Southern governments were developing policies to curb future cases and to treat those already infected. The minister of health in the North noted problems with the use of condoms as a preventive measure, and religious leaders were reluctant to discuss prevention methods beyond abstinence and monogamous marriage. Not surprisingly, citizens' knowledge about HIV/AIDS is limited.
